The following lists events that happened in 2013 in Colombia.

Incumbents
 President: Juan Manuel Santos 
 Vice President: Angelino Garzón

Events

January
 January 1 - 13 FARC members are killed in an airstrike by the Colombian military.
 January 19 - A drug lord named Amaury Smith Pomare, who had long been wanted by the police, is arrested at his villa on the Atlantic coast of Honduras.
 January 20 -  FARC rebels dynamite two southern oil pipelines and planted a bomb on the top coal exporter's northern railway after the end of a rebel ceasefire.
 January 22 - FARC rebels dynamite two southern oil pipelines and planted a bomb on the top coal exporter's northern railway after the end of a rebel ceasefire.

February
 February 9 - A magnitude 6.9 earthquake strikes southwest Colombia causing major disruption to the region and injuring at least 8 people.
 February 25 - Coffee growers of the country start a labour strike protesting the situations in which coffee growing is practiced.

March
 March 8 - The strike of the coffee growers is over.

April
Nohra Padilla, a pioneer and executive director of the Association of Recyclers of Bogotá, was awarded the 2013 Goldman Environmental Prize for her contribution to waste management and recycling in Colombia.

June
 June 10 - The Venezuelan government arrests nine Colombian right-wing paramilitaries over a plot to assassinate President Nicolás Maduro.

July
 July 20 - 17 government soldiers are killed in an attack by FARC revolutionaries in the Colombian department of Arauca.
 July 22 - The presidents of Colombia and Venezuela meet to resolve a high-level diplomatic dispute.

August
 August 19 - An agrarian strike is planned for today in Colombia to demand labor rights.

October
 October 12 - A building collapses in Colombia, killing 1, with 10 still missing.

November
 November 9 - A gunman kills eight people in a bar in Cali.

December
 December 9 - Gustavo Petro, mayor of Bogotá, is removed from office and banned from re-taking it for fifteen years, due to a failing city cleaning policy promoted by him.
 December 14 - A mass protest is held in Bogotá in protest against the unseating of Mayor Gustavo Petro.

References

 
Colombia
Colombia
Years of the 21st century in Colombia
2010s in Colombia